Niall McShea  (born 1 January 1974) is a rally driver from Northern Ireland. He won the Production World Rally Championship (PWRC) in 2004 in a Subaru Impreza WRX STI. He currently drives for the Proton R3 Rally Team in the Intercontinental Rally Challenge (IRC).

Career
McShea, who was born in Enniskillen, Northern Ireland, had his first experience at the wheel of a car was at the age of four when he slipped off the seat of his mother's car and drove into the front door of their house. In 1997 he won the Nissan Micra Challenge, before moving onto the British Rally Championship. In 2001 he competed in the first season of the Junior World Rally Championship driving a Ford Puma and then a Citroën Saxo, finishing in third in the standings. The following year he drove a Ray Mallock Ltd-prepared Opel Corsa in the championship, but mechanical issues restricted him to just two finishes, meaning he could only finish seventh in the standings.

In 2003 he moved on to the PWRC in a Mitsubishi Lancer Evo VI, finishing sixth in the standings and winning the final round of the season - the Tour de Corse. In 2004 he drove a Subaru Impreza WRX STi, and won the championship after taking four podium finishes. Funding problems would restrict McShea to limited appearances over the following seasons, but won the PWRC class on 2007 Rally Ireland. On the same event in 2009, McShea drove a Proton Satria Neo S2000, setting the third fastest stage time on the opening stage, before retiring from the event.

In 2010 McShea has continued driving for Proton in the IRC. He retired from his first outing at the Czech Rally on stage nine with technical problems while running nineteen.

References

External links 
 Profile at eWRC-results.com

1974 births
Rally drivers from Northern Ireland
Living people
World Rally Championship drivers
Members of the Order of the British Empire

Citroën Racing drivers